Winchester College football, also known as Winkies, is a code of football played at Winchester College. It is akin to the Eton Field and Wall Games and Harrow Football in that it enjoys a large following from Old Wykehamists but is not played outside the community directly connected to Winchester College. The Winkies season is during Common Time (January–March), the second term of the academic year.

History 

In the 17th century, Winchester Football was played in Kingsgate Street; each team attempted to move a football from one end to the other. There was with little in the way of rules. The game was then moved away from the College to the flat, grassy top of St. Catherine's Hill. The game persisted with few rules, but required a long line of junior men, "kickers-in", to keep the ball from rolling away down the slope.

By about 1825, the rules had been standardised and matches with large teams of 22 players, 20 in the "hot" (scrum) and 2 "behinds" (backs) were played between College and Commoners. The fundamental rules of "dribble" and "tag" were added at this stage. The game was moved from the top of St Catherine's Hill to where it is played now, on Meads. The lines of kickers-in were then replaced by canvas sheets, resulting in the name "canvas" for the football pitch, and soon afterwards by netting to allow people to watch the game without the aid of a ladder.

By 1901, teams had been reduced to 15, with 8 in the hot, 3 "hotwatchers" (scrum-halves), and 3 "behinds".

The earliest evidence of coloured shirts used to identify football teams comes from  Winchester football: an image from before 1840 is entitled "The commoners have red and the college boys blue jerseys". The use of coloured shirts at Winchester college is confirmed again in 1859: "Precisely at twelve o'clock, according to good old custom, the blue jerseys of college and the red of commoners mingled in the grand commencing "hot". That same year, Winchester College played a match of an undefined variety of football against the Winchester Garrison Officers; 28 "goals" were scored, with 11 players on each side, leading the historian Ian Denness to suggest that the rules were a hybrid of the Winchester and Eton football games.

Winkies was the first variety of football that was played in South Africa, promoted by Canon Gorge Ogilvie, principal of the Diocesan College in Rondebosch, and remaining dominant until 1878.

In 1941, the Old Wykehamist General Wavell was congratulated by telegram for his success in pushing the Italian 10th Army back in North Africa with the words "hotting the enemy over worms" (i.e. pushing the hostile scrum back over the goal line).
In 1996, the Old Wykehamist John Whittingdale, speaking in Parliament in a debate on sport, said that "at school, I was forced to play a weekly game of fives, as well as a peculiarly brutal game known as Winchester college football, which normally resulted in substantial injuries to the participants."

The pitch 

Winchester football is played on a pitch known as a "canvas", 80 metres long and 15 metres wide flanked on either side by 2.5 metre high netting (confusingly called the "canvas" as well; as is the squad for a winkies team) designed to prevent balls from being kicked off the pitch. Approximately a metre in front of the netting and running parallel to it is found a thick one-metre high rope supported by nine stout posts at intervals along the canvas (seven on some of the smaller pitches on Palmer Field). The distance between two adjacent posts is known as a "post"; hence the total length of the canvas is eight posts. The inaccessible area between the ropes and the netting is known as "Ropes". The goal area off each end of the pitch is known as "Worms".

Teams 

Major matches are played with teams made up of 15 players, known as XVs; other matches can be played with smaller teams, usually 6 or 10, known as VIs and Xs respectively. In VIs, there are two "kicks" (full-backs), one "hotwatch" (half-back) and three "hot" (scrum) players. In Xs, there are two kicks, three hotwatches and five hot players. In XVs there are three kicks, four hotwatches and eight hot players. The team sizes may differ sometimes in smaller house competitions, with IXs and XIs being common-place.

Major matches are played between three teams, called Old Tutor's Houses (OTH), Commoners, and College. OTH wear brown and white striped "zephyrs" (football shirts), and consist of men from Furley's, Toye's, Cook's, Chawker's, and Hopper's houses. Commoners wear red and white striped zephyrs, and consist of men from Kenny's, Freddie's, Phil's, Trant's, and Beloe's. College wear blue and white striped zephyrs, and consist only of men from College, the scholars' institution.

Rules 

The game somewhat resembles Rugby football, as players can kick the ball or run with it. Tatler quotes a pupil's description of it as "our combination of football and rugby, likened to an English bulldog playing with a ball". The Financial Times commented that the game would serve as a substitute for the Ancient Greek game of Pankration, but that a "Kasparov-like mind" was necessary to cope with the ever-changing rules. The aim of the game is to kick the ball (an overly inflated association football) into Worms - the area at either end of canvas. Unlike in Rugby football, a player need only kick the ball across the Worms line to score.

The basic principle is that each team can only kick the ball once before the other team touches it (unless the kicker has been deemed to have kicked it his hardest). The main rules are called "tag", "dribble", "behind your side", and "handiwork".

 "Tag" occurs when a team-mate kicks the ball, and a man on his own team then kicks it without waiting for the other team to touch the ball, i.e. passing (forwards) is not allowed.
 "Dribble" occurs when the same man touches the ball twice when the ball has not gone backwards, i.e. dribbling as in soccer is not allowed.
 "Behind your side" is designed to stop people loitering up the pitch. Once a man on your team kicks the ball, the rest of the team must endeavour to get back to the point where he kicked the ball from (not just behind the kicker as in rugby) before they can move forward up the pitch. 
 "Handiwork" is any illegal use of the hands. Only the kicks (full backs) may use their hands to control the ball. Any other man may catch the ball on the full toss, but use of the hands at any other time is deemed handiwork. A catch on the full toss by any player enables them to take up to three steps and then "bust" (punt) the ball.

Breaking any of these rules means that play is brought one or two posts back for a hot (scrum). Once the ball is out of the hot, the "hotwatches" (scrum-halves) try to get the ball past the hot, either to kick the ball into Worms, or to kick the ball into Ropes (off the canvas, resulting in a hot where the ball went out). Minor infringements result in a free Bust.

The key points of the scoring system are that:
 A "Behind" or 1 Point is scored if the ball crosses into Worms after touching an opposition player or after going into Ropes (between the rope and the netting), or if a team is awarded enough penalty Posts to send them back to Worms (the final Post along Ropes).
 A "Conversion" or 2 Points is scored, following a Behind, when an opposition kick from the point one metre in front of Worms is returned by the team that scored the Behind, and the ball crosses into Worms; this converts the Behind into a (3 Point) Goal.
 A "Goal" or 3 Points is scored when the ball enters Worms without being touched by an opposition player and without being in Ropes. After a Goal is scored play resumes from a 'Bust Off'.

See also

 English public school football games
 Notions (Winchester College)

References

Sources

 

Traditional football
School sport in the United Kingdom
Winchester College
Youth sport in England